The New Zealand women's national cricket team toured England and Ireland in June and July 1996. They first played England in 3 One Day Internationals, winning the series 3–0. They then played England in three Test matches, all of which were drawn. Finally, they played Ireland in 3 ODIs, winning the series 2–0.

Tour of England

Squads

Tour Matches

50-over match: AT Collins' XI v New Zealand

50-over match: South of England v New Zealand

50-over match: England Under-21s v New Zealand

3-day match: North of England v New Zealand

3-day match: Women's Cricket Association President's XI v New Zealand

3-day match: Midwest England v New Zealand

WODI Series

1st ODI

2nd ODI

3rd ODI

WTest Series

1st Test

2nd Test

3rd Test

Tour of Ireland

Squads

WODI Series

1st ODI

2nd ODI

3rd ODI

References

External links
New Zealand Women tour of England 1996 from Cricinfo
New Zealand Women tour of Ireland 1996 from Cricinfo

1996 in women's cricket
Women's cricket tours of England
Women's international cricket tours of Ireland
New Zealand women's national cricket team tours